The China Railways JF21 (解放21, Jiěfàng, "liberation") class steam locomotive was a class of 2-8-2 steam locomotives operated by the China Railway, built by the American Locomotive Company in the United States in 1937.

These locomotives were originally built for the Yuehan Railway, and after the establishment of the Japanese puppet government of the Reformed Government of the Republic of China, they were operated by the Central China Railway, which had been created in 1939 to manage all railway operations in the territory of the collaborationist government by nationalising all privately owned railways in the territory.

After the end of the Pacific War, these locomotives were passed on to the Republic of China Railway. After the establishment of the People's Republic of China, China Railways designated them ㄇㄎ21 (MK21) class in 1951, and they were retired in 1955.

References

2-8-2 locomotives
ALCO locomotives
Railway locomotives introduced in 1937
Steam locomotives of China
Standard gauge locomotives of China
Freight locomotives